Kathi Lynn Wilcox (born November 19, 1969) is an American musician. She is the bass player in the Julie Ruin and has been in bands such as Bikini Kill, the Casual Dots, and the Frumpies.

Music 
Wilcox attended The Evergreen State College where she studied film and worked with Tobi Vail at a sandwich shop. During this time she and friends Kathleen Hanna and Vail collaborated on a feminist zine titled Bikini Kill. The three women enlisted guitarist Billy Karren and began a feminist punk band also called Bikini Kill. Wilcox provided bass, guitar, drums, and vocals for the band, which lasted throughout the '90s and is considered one of the definitive bands of the riot grrrl movement. Wilcox's other musical projects include the Frumpies with Vail, Karren, Michelle Mae (The Make-Up), and Molly Neumann (Bratmobile);  The Casual Dots with Christina Billotte (Slant 6, Quixotic) and Steve Dore; and The Julie Ruin with Hanna, Kenny Mellman (Kiki & Herb), Carmine Covelli, and Sara Landeau.

Wilcox collaborated with Fugazi's Brendan Canty on the theme song to the punk rock-oriented children's show Pancake Mountain.

Personal life
Wilcox married musician Guy Picciotto from Fugazi, and as of September 2020 the two were living in Brooklyn with their child.

References 

1969 births
American women drummers
American women guitarists
American women singers
American feminists
American multi-instrumentalists
American punk rock bass guitarists
American punk rock singers
American rock drummers
Evergreen State College alumni
Women bass guitarists
Women punk rock singers
Feminist musicians
Living people
Riot grrrl musicians
Third-wave feminism
Bikini Kill members
The Julie Ruin members
The Frumpies members
20th-century American drummers
20th-century American bass guitarists
20th-century American women musicians
21st-century American women
Women in punk